The siege of Thouars was a Frankish siege of the Aquitanian stronghold of Thouars in 762 during the Aquitanian War. The Frankish army under King Pepin the Short besieged and captured the fort with great speed, burning the place to the ground, taking the count of Thouars captive and deporting him and Thouars' Gascon levies to Francia.

Prelude
After the siege and conquest of Aquitanian Bourges in 762, King Pepin the Short of Francia army moved on to besiege Thouars. The garrison was commanded by the count of Thouars and included Gascon levies.

Siege
The stronghold was taken with great speed and burned after the siege.

Aftermath
The Count of Thouars and the Gascon levies were taken along to Francia, as Pepin's army departed home with its plunder from the campaign.

References

Bibliography
 
 
 

Thouars 762
Thouars
762
8th century in Francia